is a Japanese actress, stunt woman, book author, opinion leader, social activist and beauty queen who was crowned Miss International 2012 in Okinawa. It was Japan's first Miss International win in the 52-year history of the pageant.

In 2014, she was intimidated or criticized by Japanese nationalist or right-wing groups for speaking about in support of the comfort women issues and has been an outspoken leader for women's rights issues.

She was a featured presenter at Ted Talks where she advocated for stronger laws to protecting women in Japan. "TED Talks"

Ikumi started the Global Student Diplomacy Network in 2015 to connect elementary and middle school classrooms from various countries with each other by skype for cultural exchange. The first exchange featured special guest Peter Yarrow of Peter Paul and Mary and the governor of Saga Prefecture, Yasushi Furukawa."
 
She obtained a degree in education and international education at the University of the Sacred Heart in Tokyo, Japan.

Ikumi is both an actress and stunt double for Tao Okamoto in three episodes of the HBO series Westworld" She is also acting in Michael Bay's Netflix movie 6 Underground" Ikumi has been cast to star in, and is currectly filming the international action thriller, 10 episodes action series Lightstinger" Ikumi starred as the lead actress in Nico Santucci's movie Sarogeto starring alongside Winsor Harmon and Eric Roberts.

References

http://www.cosmopolitan.co.uk/reports/news/a29072/beauty-queen-ikumi-yoshimatsu-stalker/
https://news.yahoo.com/beauty-vs-japan-beasts-180000042--politics.html

External links

1987 births
Living people
Miss International winners
Miss International 2012 delegates
Japanese female models
Japanese activists
Japanese women activists
Japanese feminists
Japanese beauty pageant winners
Actors from Saga Prefecture
People from Saga (city)
21st-century Japanese actresses
University of the Sacred Heart (Japan) alumni